Intelsat II F-2, also known as Lani Bird, was a communications satellite operated by Intelsat. Launched in 1967, it was operated in geostationary orbit at a longitude of 174 degrees east until 1969.

The second of four Intelsat II satellites to be launched, Intelsat II F-2 was built by Hughes Aircraft around the HS-303A satellite bus. It carried two transponders, which were powered by body-mounted solar cells generating 85 watts of power.

Intelsat II F-2 was launched atop a Delta E1 rocket flying from Launch Complex 17B at the Cape Canaveral Air Force Station. The launch took place at 10:55:00 on January 11, 1967, with the spacecraft entering a geosynchronous transfer orbit. It fired an SVM-1 apogee motor to place itself into its operational geostationary orbit, arriving on-station at 174° East on February 4, 1967. The satellite achieved around two years of operation at that slot before failing in 1969.

References

Intelsat satellites
Hughes aircraft
Spacecraft launched in 1967